Mamoudou Mara (born 31 December 1990) is a Guinean professional footballer who plays as a defender for French club Montceau Bourgogne. He previously played in the French Ligue 2 with Arles-Avignon and for Swiss club Yverdon Sport FC.

References
Mamoudou Mara profile at foot-national.com

1990 births
Living people
Sportspeople from Conakry
Guinean footballers
Guinea international footballers
Association football defenders
Dijon FCO players
AC Arlésien players
Yverdon-Sport FC players
Le Mans FC players
Ligue 2 players